New Directions is an album by Jack DeJohnette released on the German ECM label. It was recorded June 1978 at Talent Studio in Oslo and released in 1978. It features trumpeter Lester Bowie (Art Ensemble of Chicago), electric guitarist John Abercrombie and bassist Eddie Gomez.

Reception 
The Allmusic review by Scott Yanow awarded the album 3½ stars, noting, "the music is a bit dull, making too much use of space and featuring less of Bowie's trumpet and wit than one would hope. There are some strong moments (particularly from Abercrombie and DeJohnette) but this band (to use a cliché) was less than the sum of its parts".

Track listing 
All compositions by Jack DeJohnette except as indicated.
 "Bayou Fever" – 8:40
 "Where or Wayne" – 12:25
 "Dream Stalker" (Abercrombie, Bowie, DeJohnette, Gomez) – 5:55
 "One Handed Woman" (Abercrombie, Bowie, DeJohnette, Gomez) – 10:49
 "Silver Hollow" – 8:24

Personnel 
 Jack DeJohnette – drums, piano
 John Abercrombie – guitar, electric mandolin
 Lester Bowie – trumpet
 Eddie Gómez – double bass
 Jan Erik Kongshaug: engineer
 Manfred Eicher: producer
 Dieter Bonhorst: layout design
 Roberto Masotti: cover photo

References 

1978 albums
Jack DeJohnette albums
ECM Records albums
Albums produced by Manfred Eicher